Christopher Michael Pitcher (born 26 August 1973) is an English former first-class cricketer.

Pitcher was born at Croydon in August 1973 and later studied at Selwyn College, Cambridge. While studying at Cambridge, he made his debut in first-class cricket for Cambridge University against Leicestershire at Fenner's in 1992. He played first-class cricket for Cambridge until 1994, making 24 appearances. Pitcher scored a total of 226 runs in his 24 matches for Cambridge, at an average of 10.76 and a high score of 43. With his right-arm medium pace bowling, he took 37 wickets at a high average of 54.45, with best figures of 4 for 37. He also made a first-class appearance for the Combined Universities cricket team against the touring New Zealanders in 1994.

References

External links

1973 births
Living people
People from Croydon
Alumni of Trinity College, Cambridge
English cricketers
Cambridge University cricketers
British Universities cricketers